Paul Johannes Brühl (25 February 1855 – 1935) was a German-origin professor of botany who worked in India, mainly at the Presidency College, Calcutta.

Brühl was born in Saxony to Michael Brühl and was educated in Germany and received a scholarship to travel and collect botanical specimens through Europe. He then walked across Europe into Asia Minor. He taught briefly in Constantinople and reached India in 1881 and taught science at the Rajshahi College in 1882. He married Annie Betts Fox in 1883 and through the influence of Sir George King, he joined the Bengal Engineering College in 1887 where he taught chemistry, geology, and agriculture. He was popular and known for his sympathetic handling of students. He retired from the engineering college in 1912 and worked briefly at the Indian Institute of Science in Bangalore. In 1913 he was invited by Sir Ashutosh Mukherjee to serve as registrar for Calcutta University. He later served as a professor of botany. He worked on control of the water hyacinth and examined cryptogams, mosses, orchids, invasive plants, and published along with Sir George King and other botanists.

References 

1855 births
1935 deaths
Academic staff of Presidency University, Kolkata
19th-century German botanists
20th-century German botanists